Krishnapur is one of the 60 Legislative Assembly constituencies of Tripura state in India. It is in Khowai district and is reserved for candidates belonging to the Scheduled Tribes. It is also part of East Tripura Lok Sabha constituency.

Members of Legislative Assembly

 1977: Manindra Debbarma, Communist Party of India (Marxist)
 1983: Kali Kumar Debbarma, Communist Party of India (Marxist)
 1988: Khagendra Jamatia, Communist Party of India (Marxist)
 1993: Khagendra Jamatia, Communist Party of India (Marxist)
 1998: Khagendra Jamatia, Communist Party of India (Marxist)
 2003: Khagendra Jamatia, Communist Party of India (Marxist)
 2008: Khagendra Jamatia, Communist Party of India (Marxist)
 2013: Khagendra Jamatia, Communist Party of India (Marxist)

Election results

2018

2023

See also
List of constituencies of the Tripura Legislative Assembly
 Khowai district
 Tripura East (Lok Sabha constituency)

References

Khowai district
Assembly constituencies of Tripura